The 2010 ITF Men's Circuit consisted of 502 'Futures' tournaments played year round, around the world.

Schedule

January–March

April–June

July–September

October–December

Events

Top 25 players of the season
These tables present the number of singles (S) and doubles (D) titles won by each player, within all the tournaments of the 2010 ITF Futures series. The players are sorted by: 1) total number of titles; 2) a singles > doubles hierarchy; 3) alphabetical order (by family names for players).

Point Distribution
Points are awarded as follows:

References

External links
International Tennis Federation official website
ITF Futures tournaments
ITF Futures results archive

 
2010
ITF Men's Circuit